The Falkland Islands national cricket team is the team that represents the British overseas territory of the Falkland Islands in international cricket.

The team is organised by the Falkland Cricket Association, which became an affiliate member of the International Cricket Council (ICC) on 29 June 2007 (although Argentina abstained from the vote admitting it as a member) and became an associate member in 2017. The Falkland Islands played its first international match in February 2004, playing against Chile in Santiago. The team did not make its debut in an ICC-sanctioned tournament until June 2010, when it took part in the 2010 Americas Championship Division Four event in Mexico. The following year, the Falklands played in the 2011 Americas Twenty20 Division Three tournament in Costa Rica, losing all five of its matches. The territory currently has only a single cricket pitch, located on Mount Pleasant Airfield Oval, which hampers the national team's ability to participate internationally. , there were plans to construct the islands' second cricket pitch, to be built in the capital Stanley.

In April 2018, the ICC decided to grant full Twenty20 International (T20I) status to all its members. Therefore, all Twenty20 matches played between the Falkland Islands and other ICC members after 1 January 2019 will be a full T20I.

Records

One-Day 
Below is a record of international matches played in ICC Americas Championship events by the Falkland Islands.

References

Cricket in the Falkland Islands
National cricket teams
Falkland Islands in international cricket
Cricket